was a Japanese animator.

Abe was known for his mechanical animation, in particular his animation for various projects in Sunrise's Gundam franchise.

List of Gundam works he participated in:
 Mobile Suit Gundam 0083: Stardust Memory
 Mobile Suit Gundam 0083: The Afterglow of Zeon
 Mobile Suit Gundam Wing
 Mobile Suit Gundam Wing: Operation Meteor
 Mobile Suit Gundam Seed
 Mobile Suit Zeta Gundam: A New Translation
 Mobile Suit Gundam Seed C.E.73: Stargazer
 Mobile Suit Gundam 00
 Mobile Suit Gundam UC
 Gundam Build Fighters
 Gundam: Reconguista in G
 Mobile Suit Gundam: Iron-Blooded Orphans
 Mobile Suit Gundam Thunderbolt

Kunihiro Abe was also a notable animator in various AIC projects, such as Bubblegum Crisis, Dangaioh, Vampire Princess Miyu, Dragon Century, Megazone 23 Part III, Sol Bianca, Record of Lodoss War: Chronicles of the Heroic Knight, Armitage III, El Hazard - The Magnificent World, and Blue Genders.

Abe worked also with animator Masami Obari on Fight! Iczer-One, Dangaioh, and Daimaju Gekito Hagane no Oni and with animator Kou Matsuo.

Abe died on 15 August 2018 at the age of 50 of undisclosed cause. Abe's daughter shared one of his illustrations, and noted that "she knew her father loved to draw and could not live as anything other than an animator".

References

1968 births
2018 deaths
Japanese animators